The Table Tennis World Cup has been held annually since 1980. There had been only men's singles until the inauguration of women's singles in 1996 and team competitions in 1990. The team competitions, the World Team Cup, were canceled until the relaunch in 2007, and now held in odd-numbered years. The competitions are sanctioned by International Table Tennis Federation (ITTF) and classified as R1 in rating weightings, B2 in bonus weightings in the ITTF world ranking. Since 2021, the event has been replaced with the WTT Cup Finals.

Competition

Men's and Women's World Cups 
Participants of the competition are composed of:

 The current holder of the World Cup.
 The World Champion.
 The champion player or the strongest current player from each of the 6 continents (Africa, Asia, Europe, Latin America, North America and Oceania).
 1 player from the host association.
 The top 8 players from the world ranking list.
 2 wild card selections.
 No more than 2 players from an association unless a third is invited as a wild card.
 If the World Champion and the World Cup title holder is the same player, or the host association has a player qualified as title holder or from the world ranking, the vacancy goes to the next highest eligible player on the world ranking list.

World Team Cup 
 Top 7 associations at the preceding World Team Championships.
 If the team of the host association is not on the top 7 list, the team of the host association and 4 teams from continental federations would be represented at the event.

Former playing system

Men's and Women's World Cups 
The playing system is determined by the executive committee on recommendation by the Competition Department. 
The 2009 World Cup was divided into 3 stages. All matches were the best of 7 games.
The Preliminary Stage- Intercontinental Cup: The 4 continental representatives from Africa, Latin America, North America and Oceania compete on a group basis with all the members of the group. The winner of this group joins the remaining 15 players in the 1st stage.
The 1st Stage- Group Stage: The 16 players are divided into 4 equal groups, with all the members of a group playing each other, and the group winners and runners-up advance towards the 2nd stage.
The highest-ranked player is placed in Group A, the 2nd highest in Group B, the 3rd highest in Group C and the 4th highest in Group D. The remaining players are drawn into the 4 groups at a time in ranking order.
If there are 2 players from the same association, they will be drawn into separate groups but the 3rd player from the same association may be drawn into any group.
The 2nd Stage- Knockout:
Quarter Finals: 4 quarter finals (Q1-Q4) are arranged according to both the groups and the rankings in the 1st Stage. Q1-Q4 are as follows: A1 vs. B2, C1 vs. D2, D1 vs. C2, and B1 vs. A2.
Semi-finals: the matches are winner of Q1 vs. winner of Q2, and winner of Q3 vs. winner of Q4.
Winners of semi-finals enter the final, with the losers of the semi-finals competing for the third place.

World Team Cup 
All team matches are played on the Olympic System with a maximum of 4 singles and 1 doubles. And all individual matches of a team match are the best of 5 games.
Intercontinental Cup: The 4 teams from continental federations not qualified by their ranking at the preceding World Team Championships shall compete in an Intercontinental Cup played on round-robin. Only one team survives.
Knockout: 7 teams qualified from World Team Championships and the host are seeded based on latest ITTF World Team Ranking. The winner of the Intercontinental Cup play a match against the lowest seeded of the other 8 teams, other than the host association's team. The winner of this match shall promote to final knockout. The top 4 seeds are separated in different matches in quarter-finals.

Winners

Men's singles

ITTF World Cup

WTT Cup Finals

Women's singles

ITTF World Cup

WTT Cup Finals

Men's doubles

Women's doubles

Men's team

Performance by nations in Men's World Team

Women's team

Performance by nations in Women's World Team

References

External links 
 
 ITTF World Cup Page

 
Table tennis competitions
World cups
Recurring sporting events established in 1980